Mangbetu, or Nemangbetu, is one of the most populous of the Central Sudanic languages. It is spoken by the Mangbetu people of northeastern Congo. It, or its speakers, are also known as Amangbetu, Kingbetu, Mambetto. The most populous dialect, and the one most widely understood, is called Medje. Others are Aberu (Nabulu), Makere, Malele, Popoi (Mapopoi). The most divergent is Lombi; Ethnologue treats it as a distinct language. About half of the population speaks Bangala, a trade language similar to Lingala, and in southern areas some speak Swahili.

The Mangbetu live in association with the Asua Pygmies, and their languages are closely related.

Dialects
Mangbetu dialects and locations as listed by Demolin (1992):

Mangbetu proper is spoken north of Isiro, in the subregion of Haut-Uele and north of the Bomokandi River. It is found in Nangazizi and Rungu in the collectivité of Azanga, Ganga in the collectivité of Okondo, Tapili in the collectivité of Mangbetu, Medanoma in the collectivité of Mangbele, in Ndei collectivité north of Isiro, and in Mboli collectivité near Goa.
Medje (Mɛdʒɛ) is spoken south of Isiro, around Medje in Mongomassi and Medje collectivités, and also in the ethnic Mangbetu collectivités of Azanga and Ndei.
Makere is spoken around Zobia in the subregion of Bas-Uele.
Malele is spoken in Poko Territory - in the areas of Balele, Niapu, and Kisanga.
Mapopoi is spoken in Panga and the Aruwimi River.
Nabulu is spoken in Bafwasamoa, 15 km north of Nia-Nia.
Lombi is spoken in Bafwasende Territory - in Barumbi around the Opienge River, and in Maiko National Park.

Phonology

Vowels

Consonants

Retroflex consonants are slightly trilled as [ʈʳ], [ɖʳ], [ᶯɖʳ].

Other Features
One unusual feature of Mangbetu is that it has both a voiced and a voiceless bilabial trill as well as a labial flap.

 "to bring out"
 "to fan"
 "to enclose"
 "to defecate"
 "to get fat"

The labial trills are not particularly associated with back vowels or prenasalization, pace their development in some American languages.

 "leaping like a leopard"
 "kind of plan"

References

Central Sudanic languages
Languages of the Democratic Republic of the Congo